Since the establishment of the office of president in 1993, the head of state of Eritrea has been Isaias Afwerki. The president is also the head of government of Eritrea, as well as commander-in-chief of the Eritrean Defence Forces.

The list also includes the secretary-general of the Provisional Government of Eritrea, who acted as head of state between 1991 and 1993, before the proclamation of independence.

List of officeholders
Political parties

See also
Eritrea
List of colonial governors of Eritrea
Lists of office-holders
List of current heads of state and government

Notes

References

External links
World Statesmen - Eritrea

 
Eritrea politics-related lists
Eritrea
Government of Eritrea
1993 establishments in Eritrea
Heads of state